Stanley Edward Petry (born August 14, 1966) is a former American and Canadian football defensive back in the National Football League (NFL), Canadian Football League (CFL) and Arena Football League (AFL). He played college football at Texas Christian (TCU). Petry was drafted by the Kansas City Chiefs in the fourth round of the 1989 NFL Draft. He also played for the Baltimore Stallions of the CFL and Milwaukee Mustangs, Albany Firebirds, Grand Rapids Rampage, Houston ThunderBears, Buffalo Destroyers and New York Dragons of the AFL.

References

1966 births
Living people
Players of American football from Texas
American football defensive backs
Canadian football defensive backs
TCU Horned Frogs football players
Kansas City Chiefs players
New Orleans Saints players
Baltimore Stallions players
Milwaukee Mustangs (1994–2001) players
Albany Firebirds players
Grand Rapids Rampage players
Houston ThunderBears players
Buffalo Destroyers players
New York Dragons players
People from Alvin, Texas